Cut (also known as Paso or Paso Switch) is an unincorporated community in Houston County, Texas, United States. The town was founded around a watering rest stop along the Houston and Great Northern Railroad, and was originally called Paso or Paso Switch, and was renamed in 1900. By the 1990s, Cut had been abandoned.

References

Unincorporated communities in Houston County, Texas
Unincorporated communities in Texas